Honeymoon Hate is a lost 1927 American silent romantic comedy film directed by Luther Reed and written by Doris Anderson, Ethel Doherty, Herman J. Mankiewicz, George Marion Jr., and A.M. Williamson. The film stars Florence Vidor, Tullio Carminati, William Austin, Corliss Palmer, Shirley Dorman, and Effie Ellsler. The film was released on December 3, 1927, by Paramount Pictures.

Cast
Florence Vidor as Gail Grant
Tullio Carminati as Prince Dantarini
William Austin as Banning-Green
Corliss Palmer as Mrs. Fremont Gage I
Shirley Dorman as Mrs. Fremont Gage II
Effie Ellsler as Miss Molosey
Genaro Spagnoli as Bueno
Marcel Guillaume as Pietro
Albert Conti (uncredited)

References

External links 

1927 films
1920s English-language films
1927 comedy-drama films
Paramount Pictures films
American black-and-white films
Lost American films
American silent feature films
Films based on short fiction
Films based on works by Alice Williamson
1927 lost films
Lost comedy-drama films
1920s American films
Silent American comedy-drama films